Alexx O'Nell (born Alexander Leonard O'Neill on July 26, 1980) is an American actor and musician who is based in India and has appeared in films, series, and music videos in English and Indian languages. He is best known for Golondaaj, Roohi, Aarya, Main Aur Charles, Cheeni Kum, Madrasapattinam, Joker, Yeti Obhijaan, Chittagong and Urumi (Ek Yodha Shoorveer).

O'Nell began his acting career with community and regional theater in the United States, later working in television advertisements in India and internationally, and finally landing character roles and appearances in films such as the Hindi feature Cheeni Kum (2007) and the English feature Loins of Punjab Presents (2007). He later gained recognition as a contestant on the hugely popular Indian celebrity dance competition Nach Baliye (season 3, 2007).

O'Nell's first leading role in a big-budget production came with Madrasapattinam (2010). Following Madrasapattinam, O'Nell returned to television to star in the Indian primetime historical drama Jhansi Ki Rani in mid-2010, and in early 2011 he also appeared in a guest role on the drama Dhoondh Legi Manzil Humein. Late 2011 saw the release of the Hindi Language feature Jo Dooba So Paar (2011), with O'Nell in a supporting role. After almost a year's gap, O'Nell was seen in a lead role in Shirish Kunder's Joker (2012) followed shortly thereafter by a cameo in A. L. Vijay's Thaandavam (2012) released in late August and late September 2012 respectively. Finally, O'Nell starred in Bedabrata Pain's Chittagong (2012), released on October 12, 2012. O'Nell appeared in a double-lead role in the multilingual Urumi (2011), and the unreleased English-language Vasco Da Gama, (in which he plays a triple role) directed by acclaimed Indian director Santosh Sivan. Urumi released in select markets (Malayalam, Tamil, Telugu) in 2011 and 2012 and remains the second most expensive and second highest grossing Malayalam film of all time. The stage of completion and expected release date for the English-language Vasco Da Gama are unknown. O'Nell's next releases were the Malayalam films Gangster and Manglish, both featuring O'Nell alongside South-Indian actor Mammootty, releasing in April and July 2014, respectively. He was recently seen in the 2016 release Ek Yodha Shoorveer (2016) (a Hindi dubbed and re-edited version of Urumi (2011) ), Tigmanshu Dhulia's Raag Desh (2017), Inside Edge (2018), Bose: Dead/Alive (2018), and Doctor Rakhmabai, Sye Raa Narasimha Reddy, Trial of Satyam Kaushik and Banarasi Jasoos

Career

Non-entertainment 
O'Nell began working at various jobs from an early age and continued to change his career frequently throughout his adult life including working in counselling marketing and modelling. It was a marketing firm called Lester Inc. that sent him abroad and first introduced him to India by way of its partner company Enlink Infotech in 2003, a second firm would extend his experience in India and expand it to South Africa, the Philippines and the UK.

Modeling and advertising 
After working in theater, and then briefly as a fashion / print model for brands like Hyundai and Lenovo, O'Nell's onscreen career began with acting in advertisements. His most notable campaigns included Roma Switches, Panasonic Air Conditioners and Esys Computers as well as being the brand ambassador for Moulin Glaciere perfumes from 2006 to 2009.

Film and television 
O'Nell's film career began with the English comedy Loins of Punjab Presents (2007), in which he played the minor but memorable role of a flabbergasted New Jersey hotel manager (Wesminton) in the midst of a chaotic Indian American-Idol-like competition. Though Loins was his first film shot, his first cinematic release would be the dry Hindi comedy Cheeni Kum (2007), in which he appeared as a bumbling English waiter who takes the brunt of the boss's (Amitabh Bachchan) ire.

In the same year, O'Nell gained recognition as a contestant on the hugely popular Indian celebrity dance competition Nach Baliye (season 3), where he participated with Indian actor Sweta Keswani (whom he would later marry in 2008) and enjoyed widespread praise for his effort, dancing and lipsync, The Times of India commenting "when Shweta Keswani and beau Alexx O'Nell perform on stage all eyes naturally are on Alexx". He is the first non-Indian participant seen in a significant capacity on Indian national primetime television.

Following Nach Baliye, O'Nell appeared in a cameo in the 2010 Hindi-language feature Malik Ek, which, despite a cast of well-known and well-respected actors, including Jackie Shroff (in the title role), Smriti Irani, Rajeshwari Sachdeva, Shakti Kapoor, and Divya Dutta, was almost unanimously regarded as a "miserable" film with "shoddy script, bad direction, [and] poor camerawork". Among the few positive mentions, critics commented about the supporting cast: "Alex O'Neil ... and the rest lend fair support."

O'Nell's first leading role in a big-budget production came in 2010 with the Tamil-language 1940s period drama Madrasapattinam, in which he starred opposite Amy Jackson (Miss Teen World) and well-known south Indian actor Arya. His performance as a spurned lover and sadistic police commissioner in 1940s colonial south India attracted praise from critics and audiences alike. Critics commented "Alex O'Neill as the menacing Robert Ellis provides the ample antagonism and evokes sympathy...". Madrasapattinam became the 4th highest grossing and the 8th most profitable film in its industry in 2010. Despite its critical acclaim and commercial success in the Indian state of Tamil Nadu, Madrasapattinam did not fare well outside its region, (perhaps due to the lack of subtitling) despite releasing in Hindi speaking markets in India, and internationally in English speaking markets in Europe and the United States, and therefore did not in itself further O'Nell's career outside south India. Madrasapattinam was re-released as "1947 - A Love Story" in Telugu in the south east of India in August 2011 to positive reviews from critics.

Following work on Madrasapattinam, O'Nell completed filming for a supporting role in the Hindi language feature Jo Dooba So Paar, a contemporary drama in which O'Nell plays an American whose Italian girlfriend (Sita Spada) gets kidnapped in the Indian state of Bihar. The film also stars notable Indian actors Vinay Pathak and Rajat Kapoor. Jo Dooba So Paar released October 2011 to extremely mixed reviews. On one hand, Daily News and Analysis gave the film 1 of 5 stars commenting "Jo Dooba So Paar is nothing you should waste your money on." And CNN IBN called it "as boring as watching paint dry." On the other hand, The Times of India awarded it 3 of 5 stars and asserted "The film holds up a charming mirror on the small town milieu...  the niche audience will enjoy the integrity of tone and character.

Simultaneously while shooting for Jo Dooba So Paar, O'Nell appeared with then real-life wife Sweta Keswani as her husband in a cameo for friend-director Rohit Roy's made-for-television film Chaar Mulakatein.

In early 2010, O'Nell also completed shooting for the critically acclaimed and Indian National Award-winning Chittagong, a period drama based on historical events surrounding the East Indian Chittagong armoury raid of 1930. O'Nell plays Charles Johnson, the British Official in charge of law and order, who is pitted against a school teacher named Surya Sen (played by Indian actor Manoj Bajpai) and a group of students who go on to famously defeat the imperial force for the first time in the history of British India. Due to similar subject matter, Chittagong was compared to the Abhishek Bachchan-starrer Khele Hum Jee Jaan Sey, which received a lukewarm reception in 2011. O'Nell has commented that Chittagong is a "grittier" depiction of the events. Chittagong also stars notable India-based British actor and acting instructor Barry John, and released to unanimously positive reviews on October 12, 2012. Critics commented "... Charles Johnson [Alexx O'Nell], ... along with the others perform brilliantly.". Bollywood trade analyst Komal Nahta added "Alexx O’Nell, as Charles Johnson, plays the cruel officer by getting into the skin of the character." Hindustan times asserted "The performances are earnest and genuine to the core..." and "Alexx O'Nell ... leave[s] a tremendous impression...". Box Office India critiqued O'Nell and John together writing: "Barry John and Alexx O'Nell act ably", with News Track India adding "[O'Nell and John] who have played the characters of Britishers are superb...".

In mid-2010 O'Nell returned to television for the first time since Nach Baliye to star in the Zee TV Indian primetime historical drama Jhansi Ki Rani (JKR), wherein he played Robert Ellis, a British officer sympathetic to the plight of a revolutionary Indian queen in her struggle against the British colonial rule of the 1850s. His character is loosely based on the real-life historical figure of the same name whose relationship with the queen (Rani Lakshmibai) is the controversial subject of a historical fiction novel Rani – a work which has attracted protest and was subsequently banned in present-day Jhansi. O'Nell appears to have incorporated the author's creative interpretation into his performance, commenting: "I'll be portraying the role of a British officer named Ellis who has an affair with an Indian Queen (Jhansi Ki Rani)."

In early 2011 O'Nell also appeared in a guest role on the popular Star One TV contemporary drama Dhoondh Legi Manzil Humein (DLMH) as Ralph, the jealous and borderline abusive boyfriend of the protagonist – a role that showed him in stark contrast to his brooding yet lovable and heroic performance in JKR. DLMH was his first portrayal of a character with "negative shades" on Indian national primetime television.

In early 2011, while continuing to shoot for JKR and DLMH, O'Nell completed filming for lead roles in the multilingual Urumi and the English language Vasco Da Gama, both simultaneously directed by acclaimed Indian director Santosh Sivan.

O'Nell was approached for Urumi after being recommended to Santosh Sivan by multiple sources, including Madrasapattinam director A. L. Vijay as well as Italian Actor Sita Spada (with whom O'Nell acted in Jo Dooba So Paar). After casting O'Nell for the character Estêvão da Gama, Sivan expanded the role, and later offered him the role of Vasco Da Gama as well. Therefore, in Urumi, O'Nell plays both Vasco da Gama and Vasco's son Estêvão da Gama. Sivan reportedly decided to shoot additional scenes and make a 90-minute English feature entitled Vasco da Gama, and offered O'Nell an additional character of a modern-day traveler, and therefore he is expected to appear in three roles in the film Vasco da Gama. According to Sivan both films have as their subject matter the travels of the 15th century explorer Vasco Da Gama and the Indian warriors that set out to assassinate him, but the two have very different plot lines and perspective. Speaking about working with Sivan, O'Nell commented in an interview that "Sivan is the Steven Spielberg of Indian cinema". While Urumi released in Malayalam, Tamil, and Telugu in 2011 & 2012 to excellent reviews, Hindi and English language releases are pending.

In February 2011 O'Nell began work on Shirish Kunder's Akshay Kumar and Sonakshi Sinha starrer Joker. O'Nell's first comedy since Cheeni Kum, Joker is the story of an Indian village called Paglapur, "isolated, with no electricity, television or sanity" [38]. "Akshay Kumar creates a hoax by involving aliens in order to attract attention to the village's problems." O'Nell and Kumar play "Rivals... pitted against each other" where "Alexx O'Neil ... [is] a cynical American who calls Paglapur's bluff." Joker released August 31, 2012 to mixed but predominantly negative reviews, critics calling it everything from a "Total Fail", to "disappointing", to "amusing but predictable", and finally a "one-time watch as it is a mass entertainer and delivers a lovely message.". Despite the film's reviews and average rating of 2.5 out of 5 stars, O'Nell's performance attracted unanimous praise with MovieZadda reporting "Alexx O'Nell gave a decent performance", and the Times Of India explaining "Some performances - Talpade especially, O'Nell too - are stand-out while Kumar is adequate."

In early December 2011 O'Nell teamed up once again with Director A L Vijay (Madrassapatinam (2010)) to shoot for a cameo in the Tamil language; Thaandavam. Thaandavam is the second film after Madrassapatinam in which O'Nell and Amy Jackson both perform although they do not appear together in Thaandavam. The film also stars South Indian superstar Vikram, Anushka Shetty, and Jagapathi Babu. Thaandavam released in September 2012 to positive reviews.

2012 marked a significant turning point for O'Nell's acting career in terms of the volume of work, the significance of roles, and the array of languages in which they released. Of his four releases in 2012, one film featured him in a cameo in Tamil (Thaandavam), two featured him in lead roles in Hindi (Chittagong, Joker), and one in multiple languages including Portuguese, Tamil, and Malayalam in a double-leading role (Urumi).

2014 saw the release of the Malayalam films Gangster and Manglish, both featuring O'Nell alongside South-Indian superstar Mammootty, released in April and July, respectively. Manglish fared far better critically and commercially than Gangster. In 2014 O'Nell is rumoured to have shot for a cameo in the Suraj Sharma starrer Umrika.

Apart from the 2016 release of Ek Yodha Shoorveer (2016), a Hindi dubbed and re-edited version of Urumi (2011), O'Nell was seen in what had previously been known as Pooja Bhatt's Hindi-language film Bad, re-titled as director Prawaal Raman's Main Aur Charles (2015). The film centers around the Tihar Jailbreak of 1986 during which O'Nell's Richard Thomas was the unwilling accomplice to Randeep Hooda's Charles Sobhraj, and eventually became his undoing as state's-witness in the trial that ensued. ONell's reviews were excellent with the Times of India quoting Hollywood Director Michael Hoffman saying "I loved the performances of all actors, especially ... Alex O'Neil" Filmfare.com called his contribution a "solid supporting performance" l and Odisha News adding "Alex O’Neil as Richard Thomas... is impressive and worth a mention"

2018's releases were Raag Desh (2018), Inside Edge (2018), Bose: Dead/Alive (2018), and 2019 saw the release of O'Nell's films Sye Raa Narasimha Reddy and Trial of Satyam Kaushik . Doctor Rakhmabai Banarasi Jasoos are yet to release.

Personal life 
The son of a Dutch Mother and Irish-American Father, O'Nell was born in the US state of Connecticut and has one sister who was married in September 2007.

O’Nell's relationship with Indian actress Sweta Keswani, began in 2006 and saw the two compete successfully in the Indian Celebrity dance competition Nach Baliye Season 3 in 2007. Their relationship was not free of scandal. O'Nell was linked to India-based British actor Hazel Crowney in April 2008, and an article alleges "Shweta's parents were dead against her marrying Alex who is an American. When Sweta made up her mind to marry him finally against her parents wishes – her parents parted ways with her." Nevertheless, their relationship and subsequent marriage was widely regarded as an ideal coming together of eastern and western cultures with significant attention paid to the pair. O'Nell and Keswani were married in October and November 2008 in four different ceremonies including Court (Legal), Buddhist, Hindu, and Christian. The Hindu wedding was a secret affair closed to the media and took place in Mumbai The Christian wedding took place on a private beach in the Indian state of Goa. Their honeymoon in Egypt was marred by the Mumbai Terror Attacks of 2008, and they returned shortly after. Following their wedding, O'Nell and Keswani appeared as a couple in the news, magazines (including the cover of India Today, Simply Mumbai, December 2007) and on various television programs including Star Vivaah, and Ghar Ghar Mein. They played a couple in the made-for-television film Chaar Mulakatein, directed by friend of the couple Rohit Roy. O'Nell and Keswani lived together in Mumbai India until their separation in 2011. Preferring to keep their relationship out of the public eye, the two initially issued a joint statement to the media, but later both parties broke their silence. Explaining why they were apprehensive to speak to the media, O'Nell commented in an interview "People like drama and sensationalism, but unfortunately or fortunately, there's none here. Sweta and I are very close and there's no bad blood. I wish people understand that we wish well for each other." Keswani cited "different goals, desires and needs [as well as] professional commitments [that] kept us apart" as reason for the breakup. The separation and subsequent relationship appears amicable, Keswani commenting: "Alexx ... remains my close friend" and O'Nell adding: "We've got no plans of cutting each other out of our lives".

In mid-2011 speculation began regarding O'Nell's relationship with well-known Indian actress and fashion designer Shama Sikander. While O'Nell has never publicly commented on the relationship, the two were spotted with increasing frequency throughout 2011 and into 2012 and speculation continued until Sikander confirmed that they were indeed in a relationship in an interview which featured on the cover of Showtime Magazine December 2011 issue. In a January 2015 Times of India interview O'Nell and Sikander confirmed their separation.

Filmography

Films

Music

Web / OTT

Television

References

External links 
 

Living people
1980 births
Male actors in Malayalam cinema
21st-century American male actors
Male actors from Connecticut
American male film actors
American male television actors
Boston University alumni
American expatriates in India
American expatriate actors in India
Male actors in Hindi cinema
Male actors in Tamil cinema